The 2020–21 Seton Hall Pirates men's basketball team represented Seton Hall University in the 2020–21 NCAA Division I men's basketball season. They were led by eleventh-year head coach Kevin Willard. The Pirates played their home games at the Prudential Center in Newark, New Jersey and Walsh Gymnasium in South Orange, New Jersey as members of the Big East Conference. In a season limited due to the ongoing COVID-19 pandemic, they finished the season 14–13, 10–9 in Big East play to finish in a tie for fourth place. As the No. 5 seed in the Big East tournament, they defeated St. John's in the quarterfinals before losing to Georgetown in the semifinals.

Previous season 
The Pirates finished the 2019–20 season 21–9, 13–5 in Big East play to finish in a three-way tie for first place; the program's first regular season title since 1992–93. However, the season ended due to the ongoing COVID-19 pandemic prior to playing a game in the Big East tournament, which was canceled during the first quarterfinal round game, following a campaign in which the Pirates were projected to receive an at-large bid to the also-canceled 2020 NCAA tournament regardless of how they fared in the Big East tournament.

Offseason

Departures

Incoming transfers

2020 recruiting class

Roster

Schedule and results 

|-
! colspan=9 style=| Non-conference regular season

|-
!colspan=9 style=|Big East regular season

|-
!colspan=9 style=|Big East tournament

Rankings

References 

Seton Hall
Seton Hall
Seton Hall
Seton Hall Pirates men's basketball seasons